Weekes is a village in the Canadian province of Saskatchewan within the Rural Municipality of Porcupine No. 395 and Census Division No. 14. The village is located 29 km east of the Town of Porcupine Plain on Highway 23.

History 
Weekes incorporated as a village on January 13, 1947.

Demographics 

See also

List of communities in Saskatchewan
Hamlets of Saskatchewan

References

Villages in Saskatchewan
Porcupine No. 395, Saskatchewan
Division No. 14, Saskatchewan